was one of the leaders of Shimabara Rebellion at Japan.

Outline
His father was Nishimura Magobei (西村 孫兵衛, other name: 森 長意 Mori Nagamoto). Since his ancestor's generations, the Mori family worked as Shinto priests at Kawauchi province.

He was born as Mori Dennosuke (森 傅之丞). The child Dennosuke was decided since his childhood that he would be the Konishi's retainer in a line length. For the time, Korea sent troops to the line length, carrying a lot of luggage crossing the sea. However, the ship wrecked and was saved by the Southerner, the Dutches picked it up for 6–7 years of spending.

Afterwards, China inserted the mausoleum for gunpowders, due to a surgical treatment, instructed in confusion with the fire attack. While returning to Japan, the line length had already taken. Therefore, it concealed for a while at Kōyasan.

The Castle of Osaka fell through the fight with Sanada Yukimura, that was renamed to The Escape of Mori Sōiken and stood in Higo Province.

He was killed in the Shimabara Rebellion. He had an apprentice named Osakabe Tazaki.

Popular culture
Futaro Yamada's Makai Tenshō tells that after the Shimabara Rebellion, he survived. He learned a ninja art to revive Amakusa Shirō and Miyamoto Musashi.

1638 deaths
Japanese rebels
Samurai
Year of birth unknown